Elizabeth McGuire may refer to:

 The titular character of Lizzie McGuire
Elizabeth McGuire, character in American Psycho 2